The expansion of the National Women's Soccer League began with the league's sophomore season in 2014, when the league expanded to a ninth team in Houston, and is an ongoing process that currently has seen five expansions, three direct or indirect relocations, and one contraction. The National Women's Soccer League (NWSL) was established as the top level of professional women's soccer in the United States in 2013 in the wake of the Women's United Soccer Association (WUSA, 2001–2003) and Women's Professional Soccer (WPS, 2009–2011).

, the NWSL consists of twelve teams with twelve separate ownership groups. Previously, former commissioner Jeff Plush expressed plans to expand to 14 by the year 2020 in the wake of the 2015 FIFA Women's World Cup, but four years later then-president Amanda Duffy alluded that the league would rather take its time and focus on adding more quality teams:

“We’re really concentrating on the quality of the ownership, the quality of the market, the quality of existing facilities – both the match venue, training facilities — staff, infrastructure and the support in that market for soccer and women’s soccer, in particular. So, the past year, we’ve been really trying to refine that process and refine what it is that we’re looking for and what is the pace that we want to grow as a league? Because we’re a strong league. We were strong at 10, we’re strong at nine.

“If we all of sudden next year end up at 16 teams, how does that impact the quality of our competition and is that a pace that is sustainable and that we can still continue to operate with on a broader scale? Our efforts are very focused and specific to certain areas that we want to be strong for any team that’s does come into the league that’s going to help propel us at the top and help to elevate the league."

In December 2019, the league announced that it would remain at nine teams for the 2020 season, and added that it was in discussion with several potential ownership groups for more new franchises as early as the 2021 season.

Many interested ownership groups are associated with existing men's soccer teams, often from Major League Soccer. Another original franchise, FC Kansas City, was initially owned by the same group running the Missouri Comets, but was sold to new ownership in January 2017 before folding in November of that year; it was replaced by the Utah Royals, another team with MLS ownership (Real Salt Lake) before controversy moved the team back to Kansas City with independent ownership.

Summary

Membership timeline

Formation and original eight teams 

When the NWSL was first announced on November 21, 2012, by US Soccer Federation President Sunil Gulati, the number and location of the original teams was the only finalized detail (the name and logo of the league was not yet confirmed, for example). Gulati announced that the league would have teams in Boston, Chicago, Kansas City, Western New York, New Jersey, Portland, Seattle and Washington, D.C. Four of the teams - the Western New York Flash, Boston Breakers, Chicago Red Stars and Sky Blue FC (in New Jersey) - moved to the new first-division NWSL from the now-defunct Women's Professional Soccer, while the other four teams were new franchises, though technically the Washington Spirit were a rebrand of the D.C. United Women. Two of the new teams had an established tie to a men's professional soccer team; Portland Thorns FC was affiliated with and owned by the same ownership group as Portland's MLS team, the Portland Timbers and FC Kansas City was affiliated with and owned by the same group running the Missouri Comets indoor soccer team.

Original expansion prospects 
The eight teams chosen for the first season came from a pool of twelve interested ownership groups.  Soon after launch, the league reportedly planned to expand to ten teams for 2014. Potential candidates included groups not accepted as part of the original eight; groups from the Los Angeles area and from Hartford, Connecticut were confirmed failed bids, as was one from the Seattle Sounders Women. After the 2014 NWSL season, none of these four ownership groups were still in the expansion picture.

There was speculation that the Vancouver Whitecaps Women could be logical candidates especially given the WWC 2015 in Canada; however, the Whitecaps cancelled their women's program (except for one U-18 academy team) in December 2012.

Connecticut 
An ownership group, previously attempting to join Women's Professional Soccer for the 2012 season, had existed in Hartford, Connecticut for a year at the time of the announcement, and had been attempting to join the initial list of teams for the NWSL. The team was intended to be named the 'Connecticut Courage', a name still under consideration. Former General Manager of the WPS side Philadelphia Independence, Terry Foley, had accepted a position with the expected Connecticut team, whose owners have not been announced publicly.

Los Angeles 
The original Los Angeles bid for an NWSL was a joint effort from the LA Strikers and Pali Blues, two of the strongest W-League teams - the LA Strikers had a working agreement with MLS side Chivas USA, and the Pali Blues were one of the winningest W-League team ever with (then) two titles and four playoff appearances in five seasons, having already included many future WPS, USWNT, and NWSL talent.  While being a merger of two strong, already-semi-pro teams in the second-largest US market, the bid was declined reportedly for geographical concerns.

Pali Blues won the 2013 W-League championship, then officially merged with LA Strikers and won the 2014 title as well.  However, after the 2014 season, the LA Strikers' MLS partner Chivas USA folded, and the Pali Blues ownership folded the W-League team shortly after to focus on the USL Pro side instead.

FC Indiana 
FC Indiana is one of the strongest WPSL sides, and had competed in WPSL Elite along with eventual NWSL sides Boston, Chicago, and Western New York.  While there was no official confirmation, the team's website suggested that they were one of the twelve original NWSL bids.

Team owner (and Haitian WNT coach) Shek Borkowski later suggested that the CFU could subsidize an NWSL team similar to the subsidization already supplied by the USSF, CSA, and FMF.

FC Indiana moved from WPSL to United Women's Soccer in 2016, for that league's sophomore season.

Early Expansion: 2013–2016

Houston Dash (2014) 
During the inaugural season, there was confirmed interest from the WPSL side Houston Aces. However, the league announced during the 2013 NWSL playoffs in August that there would be no expansion for the league's second season.

During the 2013-2014 offseason, the Houston Dynamo added their name to the list of MLS teams interested in fielding a women's side, stating that they were "exploring the opportunity" of starting an NWSL side in 2014 or 2015, and in December 2013 they announced that the Houston Dash would join the NWSL in 2014. By early December, the NWSL approved the Dynamo-run Dash for expansion in 2014 despite their earlier statement that there would be no expansion for the league's second season.

Orlando Pride (2016) 
After the media boom of the 2015 FIFA Women's World Cup, MLS side Orlando City SC entered the expansion picture. A fan blog reported the owners openly discussing their inability to comment on the issue, essentially giving an answer "without an answer being given", which OCSC followed the next day with a press release supporting women's soccer and their Elite Clubs National League (ECNL) side while stopping short of stating positively or negatively about potential NWSL expansion.

On October 20, 2015, the NWSL announced that Orlando would host the 10th NWSL team, the Orlando Pride, due to start the 2016 season. At that announcement, the Pride announced that they had hired former U.S. National Women's Team coach Tom Sermanni.

Days later, the Pride traded with the Portland Thorns for U.S. national team forward Alex Morgan — Orlando City SC had previously acquired Morgan's husband, Servando Carrasco — and Canadian national team midfielder Kaylyn Kyle, in exchange for rights to U.S. national team defender Meghan Klingenberg (via the Houston Dash and Seattle Reign FC), the first overall pick in the 2016 NWSL College Draft, an international roster spot for the 2016 and 2017 seasons, and the rights to U.S. national team midfielder Lindsey Horan. This was the most notable trade in NWSL history at the time it was made, and it was speculated widely that the acquisition of Morgan was a condition for joining the league, or at least for doing so in 2016 rather than in a future season.

Growing Pains: 2016–2018

Western New York Flash to Cary, North Carolina (2017) 
North Carolina FC, then playing in the NASL and now in the USL Championship (USLC), also expressed interest in establishing a NWSL side, with club owner Steve Malik mentioning talks between the league and the then Carolina Railhawks in May 2016. In December of that same year, the Railhawks organization prematurely released press announcements of their rebranding as well as intentions to establish expansion franchises in MLS and the NWSL. A few days later on December 6, the club officially announced its pursuit of an NWSL team, with a goal of establishing one within the next six months.

Instead of creating an expansion franchise in the NWSL, North Carolina FC acquired the rights to the 2016 NWSL championship-winning Western New York Flash. While the Flash's 2016 attendance was their second-best in their NWSL history and was fifth out of the ten 2016 NWSL teams, the Flash had much lower attendances their previous two seasons and were not close to filling Rochester Rhinos Stadium. Then-owner Joe Sahlen's familial connections to the team had eroded quickly over the previous year, and the Flash also had a public debacle in 2016 when they hosted the Seattle Reign FC in a baseball stadium on a pitch much narrower than FIFA guidelines, drawing negative national media attention to the league. The league subsequently fined the Flash, with Joe Sahlen and team president Alex Sahlen apologizing for the incident's damage to the league's reputation.

The Flash and North Carolina FC announced the sale and relocation on January 9, 2017, fewer than three months after the Flash won the 2016 NWSL championship, with the relocated team to be renamed the North Carolina Courage. In their official statement, the Sahlen family claimed that "the Western New York market is not the right fit for the NWSL and the future direction of the league". Malik had previously purchased the trademark for the original Carolina Courage franchise from the defunct Women's United Soccer Association (WUSA), and the lioness on the WUSA team's crest is featured on the NWSL team's crest.

FC Kansas City effectively to Salt Lake City, Utah (2017) 
At a press conference in September 2014, Real Salt Lake owner Dell Loy Hansen mentioned RSL expanding the club to include professional minor league and women's teams, in addition to the pro major league and amateur women's teams they already had. RSL's interest in the NWSL was officially confirmed in November, with the NWSL team intended to share a new stadium (and likely a name) with the USL Pro side Real Monarchs SLC. While the stadium deal initially looked promising, it fell through at the original location of the Utah State Fairpark in early February 2015. The team chose a new stadium location in West Valley City by early March, with meetings between RSL and the NWSL moving forward. In 2016, the Real Salt Lake Women joined United Women's Soccer in 2016 for its inaugural season. While the organization still expressed interest in a future move up to NWSL, such a move no longer appeared to be imminent; in contrast, the USL Monarchs started play in 2015 with the team's training facility (which includes a 5,000-seat stadium) opening in August 2017, still with no overt interest from RSL or NWSL in pursuing a Utah franchise at the time.

Meanwhile, the original owners of NWSL two-time champions FC Kansas City got mired in an e-mail scandal during the 2016-2017 offseason, ultimately causing the ownership group to split up and the team to be sold to Minnesota-based businessman Elam Baer. However, Baer and his management team were largely absent, causing FCKC's attendance figures to dissolve, and at times the team did not meet league minimum requirements for roster payroll or away-game traveling contingents.  This led to extensive behind-the-scenes discussions of selling FCKC once again, which led to five-year head coach Vlatko Andonovski finally leaving the club in October.

After previous talks with another Minnesota-based group and with Sporting KC both fell through, Real Salt Lake owner Dell Loy Hansen rapidly changed positions from not wanting to "promote" the RSL Women from UWS to agreeing to purchase franchise rights for a new NWSL team over the course of just 15 days, heavily influenced by discussions with Timbers/Thorns owner Merrit Paulson. At the time of the announcement, there were no indications it was a direct relocation of FC Kansas City;  later that week, it was officially announced that Baer had sold FCKC back to NWSL to fold the team, at which point franchise rights went to Hansen, with the league ultimately transferring all player contracts to Salt Lake City as well. Thus, while the team shuffle may appear to be a relocation, there was no direct sale of the team from Baer to Hansen.  The new Salt Lake NWSL team, which did not replace the existing RSL Women, ultimately played in Rio Tinto Stadium. On December 1, the new name for the Salt Lake NWSL team was announced as Utah Royals FC.

Return to Kansas City (2021), potential return to Utah 
Following a player strike that caused the postponement of MLS matches on August 27, 2020, Royals owner Dell Loy Hansen expressed his disappointment in an interview with local radio station KXRK, also threatening to cease funding the club due to players not playing to show support for Black Lives Matter and to protest the shooting of Jacob Blake. In the following days, articles in The Athletic and The Salt Lake Tribune documented multiple allegations of racist behavior in the larger RSL organization, prompting both MLS and NWSL to open investigations and ultimate force Hansen to sell all components of Utah Soccer Holdings.

As the ownership search for RSL came within a month of MLS' January 8 deadline with no clear opportunity, NWSL closed franchise right for Utah and added a new expansion back in Kansas City. (This was done as NWSL did not have finances for a backup option to run the Royals in the same manner that MLS could opt to run RSL for a year.) All player rights, draft picks, and other assets were transferred to the new Kansas City team in the same manner that FC Kansas City's assets were originally transferred to the Royals. NWSL and Utah Soccer Holdings announced that the new buyer for Utah Soccer Holdings would have the option to enter NWSL with the Royals branding as soon as 2023.

Boston Breakers disbanded (2018) 

Prior to the sudden disbanding of FC Kansas City, it was the Boston Breakers that were in discussion for Real Salt Lake to take over. The team never had a truly viable long-term home stadium and only averaged over 3,000 fans for a full season once in their recent history.  The collapse of the FCKC situation was thankfully coincident with the appearance of potential investors for Boston, though the investors were uncertain to be ready in time for the 2018 season. On Jan 28, the NWSL announced the Boston Breakers would fold, and players distributed to the other franchises through a dispersal draft on Jan 30th.

Growth Phase: 2019–present

Racing Louisville FC (2021) 
In March 2019, discussion about Lynn Family Stadium in Louisville, Kentucky, set to open in 2020 as the new home of USLC side Louisville City FC, included discussion of a potential NWSL team, eyeing 2021 or 2022 — notable due to the existing connection between then NWSL president Amanda Duffy and the USLC side, as she had held three top-level positions within the club during her tenure there. By August, reports began coming out that Louisville was very close to being approved as the 10th team for the 2020 NWSL season. However, this was later pushed back to 2021 because of Louisville City's concerns about its transition to the new stadium, with the 2020 expansion planned to go to Sacramento instead. The Louisville franchise was officially announced on October 22, 2019 and unveiled as Proof Louisville FC on November 12 of that year. This marked the first time an NWSL franchise was announced more than five months in advance of its first game. However, fan backlash to the name - and to the associated rebrand of parent club Lou City FC - cause the ownership group to balk, later deciding on new name Racing Louisville FC and an entirely new crest.

Angel City FC (2022) 
After MLS side Chivas USA folded, the league awarded a new team to the Los Angeles area in 2014, whose ownership group included USWNT legend Mia Hamm, her husband Nomar Garciaparra, and Lakers legend and Sparks co-owner Magic Johnson. This caused some criticism of Hamm for investing in men's soccer before women's soccer, but mostly fueled speculation that the new MLS side would likely invest in an NWSL team as well, which Hamm commented "just makes sense". When asked about the status of an LAFC NWSL team following the 2019 FIFA Women's World Cup, Hamm stated that the LAFC ownership group was focused on getting several years of experience with MLS revenues and expenses before committing to an NWSL team.

In the summer of 2020, news broke of a new NWSL Los Angeles expansion talks with some potential MLS involvement. LAFC denied being the MLS side involved with this group, suggesting instead that the Los Angeles Galaxy (who already field a team in WPSL) as the potential operating partner. However, on July 21, 2020, the NWSL confirmed that it had awarded expansion rights to a group of investors to bring a team to Los Angeles, not including the Galaxy but including Hamm and her husband, targeting entry for the 2022 season. No formal team name was announced, though the investment group coined itself "Angel City" and has premptively registered a trademark for "Angel City FC". The investment group consisted of a variety of celebrities, including Natalie Portman, Jennifer Garner, and Eva Longoria, as well as Reddit co-founder Alexis Ohanian and his wife, tennis player Serena Williams, author Glennon Doyle, and Casey Neistat. Several former members of the United States women's national soccer team, including Julie Foudy, Mia Hamm, and Abby Wambach, were also involved in the effort.

San Diego (2022) 
The San Diego expansion bid initially began as a joint venture between USL side Sacramento Republic FC, investor Ronald Burkle, and WPSL team California Storm before complications caused fracturing within the bid and a move to San Diego instead.

Sacramento Republic FC commented on Twitter several times in 2015 and 2016 that adding an NWSL side is part of their long-term plan. Kevin Nagle, a part of the Republic's ownership group, further confirmed their interest in a women's team in November 2016 after the NWSL's commissioner at the time, Jeff Plush, identified California as a priority market for the league. In 2019, it was reported Sacramento was in advanced discussions to join the NWSL in 2020, with ownership group being led by Sacramento Republic owner Kevin Nagle with involvement from the California Storm WPSL team, who recently added USWNT legends Brandi Chastain and Leslie Osborne and Brazilian WNTer Sissi to their board of directors. However, the deal fell through, partially due to uncertainty surrounding the league in its late-year conflict with USSF concerning league operations, as well as unspecified issues with the Sacramento group. Despite those issues, Sacramento remains on the table as of July 2020.

On January 12, 2021, commissioner of the NWSL Lisa Baird shared in a press conference that an expansion team in Sacramento would join the league in 2022, but that the team ownership would make the official announcement in due course. No such announcement evercame, though, and it was eventually revealed that Burkle was pulling out of the Sacramento MLS bid. The Sacramento NWSL bid team, though, had already been paying expansion costs to the league, and later requested to move its expansion rights to the San Diego market. On June 8, 2021, the NWSL announced that San Diego has been awarded an NWSL expansion team, owned by investor Ronald Burkle and led by team president Jill Ellis.

Salt Lake City (2024) 
Upon the sale and relocation of the original Utah Royals to Kansas City on December 7, 2020, NWSL and Utah Soccer Holdings announced that the new buyer for Utah Soccer Holdings would have the option to enter NWSL with the Royals branding as soon as 2023. On January 5, 2022, Real Salt Lake was formally sold to a group led by David Blitzer, best known as a co-owner of the Philadelphia 76ers and Crystal Palace, and Utah Jazz owner Ryan Smith. The same day in an interview with Salt Lake Tribune, Blitzer stated that "from our perspective, that's a function of when, not if" in regards to exercising the option to reestablish the Utah Royals in NWSL, per the agreement from 2020. The next day the Utah Royals' social media accounts reposted his quote, the first time they had been active since the time after the team was initially sold and relocated in December 2020.

On May 13, 2022, Real Salt Lake's ownership was among the seven groups Grant Wahl reported had strong interest in starting NWSL expansion teams. On June 30, 2022, NWSL commissioner Jessica Berman commented that any new teams would enter the league in 2024 at the earliest while expressing a desire to re-negotiate the fixed fee for re-activating the Utah franchise. That same day, ESPN reported that Utah Royals FC were expected to be one of two expansion teams for NWSL's 2024 season. On January 27, 2023, it was reported that the NWSL would expand to Utah, San Francisco and Boston. The owners in Utah would pay $2-5 million, while the groups in San Francisco and Boston would pay $50 million. Utah and San Francisco would join the NWSL in 2024 and Boston would join the NWSL later, likely in 2026.

San Jose/San Francisco Bay Area (2024) 
Conflicting reports in 2014 and 2015 linked MLS's San Jose Earthquakes to a potential NWSL team. However, Earthquakes president Dave Kaval stated in May 2016 that the Earthquakes were interested in bringing an NWSL side to San Jose but were waiting for the approval and completion of a training and academy complex in order to be capable of hosting a NWSL or USL side. Kaval reiterated his previous comments on the NWSL in November, and added with regard to the training facility that "We’re in Week 20 in a 60-week process. Next summer they could certify the EIR (environmental impact report)."

In January 2021, reports emerged of a new ownership group (unnamed former United States women's national soccer team players, separate from the Earthquakes) being interested in bringing NWSL to San Jose, with plans to play at the PayPal Park. On May 13, 2022, an SF Bay Area bid was among the seven groups Grant Wahl reported had strong interest in starting NWSL expansion teams. On June 21, 2022, former United States women's national soccer team players Brandi Chastain, Leslie Osborne, Danielle Slaton, and Aly Wagner officially announced this bid to join NWSL branded as "NWSL to the Bay." On January 27, 2023, it was reported that the NWSL would expand to Utah, San Francisco and Boston. The owners in Utah would pay $2-5 million, while the groups in San Francisco and Boston would pay $50 million. Utah and San Francisco would join the NWSL in 2024 and Boston would join the NWSL later. likely in 2026.

Future expansion prospects 
In early 2015, six groups had expressed interest in gaining entry into NWSL, four of which were known - Real Salt Lake, the Indy Eleven, the Pittsburgh Riverhounds, and an independent group from Atlanta. The other two groups were rumored to be western MLS clubs. NWSL commissioner Jeff Plush stated that any potential expansion for 2016 would have to be announced soon after the April owners' meeting; the Atlanta group was the only publicly announced group interested in 2016 expansion, and when no announcement came from NWSL by May, it seemed 2016 expansion was dead. However, the success of the United States women's national soccer team in the 2015 FIFA Women's World Cup renewed expansion talks, with the number of interested groups ballooning to twelve - more than the current size of the league. The first result of this post-WWC boom was Orlando's expansion into the league for the 2016 season.

Several months after the NWSL announced the Orlando Pride's addition to the league, commissioner Jeff Plush also announced that the NWSL planned to expand by an additional four teams, to a total of 14 teams by 2020. At the time, Plush suggested that the league was in varying stages of talks with a dozen different potential expansion groups, many of whom were from MLS organizations. MLS commissioner Don Garber stated in April 2016 that half of MLS teams could be running NWSL teams in the near future.

In August 2019, Merritt Paulson, principal owner of Portland Thorns FC in the NWSL and the Portland Timbers in MLS and also a major player in the NWSL's expansion committee, held an open forum with supporters in which he stated there were two new teams committed to the NWSL for 2020, and a third aiming for a 2021 launch. He added that the teams in line for 2020 were in the Southeast and West Coast, and that the potential 2021 entry would be a “really significant, big-name addition” to the NWSL. Paulson then went further, saying "One of them’s an MLS team, one of them will be an MLS team, one of them’s a USL team. That’s probably more than I should have said." An unnamed source told the women's soccer news outlet The Equalizer that the three markets Paulson was alluding to were, in order of mention, Atlanta (MLS side Atlanta United FC), Sacramento (USL Championship side Sacramento Republic FC), and Louisville (USL Championship side Louisville City FC). Louisville was the first of these markets to be officially announced as a new NWSL entry. Sacramento's bid was mentioned on January 12, 2021, by then NWSL commissioner Lisa Baird as joining the league in 2021, though the expansion bid was moved to San Diego and officially announced on June 8 that same year.

In late 2019, the league announced plans to expand from nine teams to fourteen over the next three years. However, a combination of disagreements between NWSL and USSF on how the league should be run (especially concerning a commissioner) and the later COVID-19 pandemic, this schedule was pushed back with no expansion in 2020. However, multiple league officials still have voiced optimism about reaching fourteen teams in the near future.

On May 13, 2022, sports journalist Grant Wahl reported that seven groups had strong interest in starting NWSL expansion teams: MLS ownership groups of Atlanta United FC, Austin FC, FC Cincinnati, Real Salt Lake, and Toronto FC, as well as non-MLS ownership groups in MLS markets of Columbus and the San Francisco Bay Area (San Jose specifically). At the beginning of 2022 Jeff Blitzer, the new lead owner of Real Salt Lake, had mentioned the club's intention of reestablishing Utah Royals FC in NWSL. The San Francisco Bay Area group formally announced their bid on June 21, 2022. On June 30, 2022, NWSL commissioner Jessica Berman commented that any new teams would enter the league in 2024 at the earliest. ESPN reported the same day that Utah Royals FC were expected to be one of two expansion teams to join NWSL for the 2024 season. This same report confirmed the interest of the seven groups Wahl had previously listed as well as added that MLS clubs Nashville SC and St. Louis City SC had interest in establishing NWSL clubs.

Historical Bids (not currently active)

Atlanta 
An investment group out of Atlanta went public in early January 2015 with its intent to bring an NWSL team to the city that has already seen two incarnations of professional women's soccer in WUSA and WPS - with a website already live and a stadium already decided. While there was initial fan interest, many objected to the initially proposed name of the Atlanta Vibe, prompting the investment group to open a poll for the name, as was a survey for team colors. The group eventually chose red and black for the team's identity, while the stadium was changed from Henderson Field at Grady Stadium to Silverbacks Park, but there had been no sign of any talk between the group and NWSL at that point, despite the fact that the group has been working toward NWSL expansion for over 18 months. After the early-summer NWSL owners' meeting, it appeared that Atlanta was rejected for 2016 and would have to continue trying for future expansion.

In December 2016, rumors surfaced of another group reportedly trying to bring both NASL and NWSL teams to Atlanta. The proposed team would play at a to-be-constructed facility in DeKalb County. The group revealed itself in February 2017 as First Team SC and announced their proposal to play in the just-announced Atlanta Sports City complex in DeKalb County. This included a scheduled announcement for April 2017, but First Team SC delayed that announcement indefinitely, citing "the landscape of American soccer changing dramatically."  Fans reported receiving surveys via e-mail concerning the ongoing efforts in December 2017 with the aim of a 2019 launch.

As reported in 2019, "Atlanta United are considering launching a professional women's team to compete in the NWSL, and may do so as soon as 2021." On May 13, 2022, Atlanta United FC's ownership was among the seven groups Grant Wahl reported had strong interest in starting NWSL expansion teams.

Austin, Texas 
Austin, Texas has been listed as a potential NWSL expansion candidate multiple times since summer of 2018, though very few details are known concerning the potential ownership group aside from a rare mention of Anthony Precourt of MLS' Austin FC. On May 13, 2022, Austin FC's ownership was among the seven groups Grant Wahl reported had strong interest in starting NWSL expansion teams.

FC Barcelona
In July 2016, FC Barcelona president Josep Maria Bartomeu stated in an interview on Barça TV that he wanted to "create a team that can take part in the National Women's Soccer League". The Spanish club was reportedly interested in establishing a NWSL side in New York, Los Angeles, or the San Francisco Bay area. Barcelona's board approved plans to pursue an NWSL expansion team in May 2017, with a goal of launching the team as early as 2018 but no further details released to the public. The expansion effort was ultimately pushed back to a 2019 launch date, with Barça zeroing in on Santa Monica, California as a potential location.

Soon after, it was reported that FCB and LAFC were in talks to work together at bringing NWSL to Los Angeles. After years of talks, though, the prospect of a joint expansion effort fell through, with sources from NWSL stating that FCB's desire to keep their branding was a major reason for any expansion effort including FCB to be unlikely. Concerns about requests for changing NWSL's international player rules were also said to be a sticking point.

Canada 
On April 16, 2013, just after the NWSL's inaugural season began, The Equalizer interviewed NWSL Commissioner Cheryl Bailey about numerous topics, including expansion. She responded to a question focused on Toronto and Vancouver by noting that there was considerable interest in longer-term expansion, but also interest in getting in early, ostensibly for the 2014 season, and said that the NWSL would start looking at expansion potential in Canada toward the later portion of the 2013 season.

In July 2014, Peter Montopoli, general secretary of the Canadian Soccer Association, suggested that the upcoming 2015 Women's World Cup offered an opportunity for the NWSL to expand to Canadian cities, with speculation that the expansion could even occur in time for the 2015 NWSL season. However, in late August 2014, Bailey said there would be no expansion for 2015, citing the logistical challenges of scheduling the league around the Women's World Cup that might put off expansion until at least 2016.

With high fan interest in Canada during and following the World Cup, the Whitecaps reiterated that there was "nothing imminent" in terms of the Whitecaps organization joining NWSL, making it highly unlikely that they were one of the then-dozen groups in discussion with the league concerning expansion. At an end-of-season meeting with three Whitecaps supporters groups in 2016, the Whitecaps inquired about the prospect of a Vancouver NWSL team. Meanwhile, officials and spokespersons for Toronto FC and the Montreal Impact reiterated that their clubs had no intention of joining the NWSL.

Following Canada's gold medal victory in the 2020 Summer Olympics in Tokyo, renewed calls were made for a Canadian-based team in the NWSL. With Canada Soccer President Nick Bontis wanting to bring a NWSL team to Canada or for a dedicated Canadian professional league.

On May 13, 2022, Toronto FC's ownership was among the seven groups Grant Wahl reported had strong interest in starting NWSL expansion teams.

Cincinnati 
MLS expansion club FC Cincinnati has expressed interest in gaining a NWSL club once their new West End Stadium, ultimately named TQL Stadium, opened in 2021. USWNT and NWSL star Rose Lavelle, a Cincinnati native, has spoken several times about her desire to play professional soccer in Cincinnati. On May 13, 2022, FC Cincinnati's ownership was among the seven groups Grant Wahl reported had strong interest in starting NWSL expansion teams.

Dallas 
FC Dallas reinstated its WPSL team FC Dallas Women for the 2016 WPSL season, after having only fielded an ECNL side following a previous two-year stint in WPSL. While the team's coach Ben Waldrum suggested that an NWSL franchise should be a goal, he noted in June 2016 that there had been no directive from Hunt Sports Group to pursue one.

SouthStar FC played in the WPSL (Women's Premier Soccer League) in its inaugural season in 2019. The 2020 season was cancelled due to the COVID-19 Pandemic. They will be playing in the 2021 WPSL Season. Their primary focus is growing Women's Soccer in the Dallas/Ft. Worth market and feels the NWSL would be successful here.

Indianapolis 
Indy Eleven, which moved from the NASL to the USL after the 2017 season and was previously led by ex-Chicago-Red-Stars GM Peter Wilt, expressed interest in an NWSL side in 2015, contingent on them getting a new soccer-specific stadium built for the Eleven with a target date in 2017. The Eleven's inability to secure the stadium plan delayed Indianapolis NWSL expansion until 2018 at the earliest. In 2019, the Indiana General Assembly passed a stadium bill for the Eleven, for the newly proposed Eleven Park. The developers have expressed interest in a potential Women's soccer team to play at the stadium.

On September 24, 2021, Indy announced the formation of an amateur women's team to join the pre-professional USL W League for its inaugural 2022 season.

The club announced on June 24, 2022, that it had acquired over 20 acres of land and will construct a 20,000 seat multi-purpose stadium starting in spring 2023 and opening in spring 2025. Their press release stated that "The Eleven Park stadium will host Indy Eleven games for both its men’s and women’s professional soccer teams." though at the time of release the club's women's team was amateur and playing in a pre-professional league. It remains to be seen when Indy Eleven will seek to turn its women's team professional, and whether that will be in the NWSL or the upcoming professional second division USL Super League which is set to begin play in 2023.

Miami
Inter Miami CF owner David Beckham has voiced interest in adding an NWSL Inter Miami CF Women side to his MLS club but no plans have been openly discussed.

Minnesota 
Before NWSL bought FC Kansas City back from Minnesota-based Elam Baer, a second Minnesota-based group was in discussion for purchasing the team, though discussion about relocation was unsure. After the sale and disbanding of the team, Baer stated that he was interested in eventually rejoining NWSL ownership to bring a team directly to Minnesota as he believed the league to be "a good long-term investment". 

On November 3rd, 2022, it was reported that USL W League side Minnesota Aurora were seeking an expansion bid to join NWSL. The club was previously reported to be seeking to become professional in either the USL Super League or NWSL.

New York City 
City Football Group has expressed interest in starting a team in NWSL to mirror their MLS side New York City FC after having created very successful sister teams to Manchester City and Melbourne City. During the time when it was known as Sky Blue FC, current NWSL side NJ/NY Gotham FC had been in talks with both NYCFC and the New York Red Bulls for a partnership, but nothing came of the 2014 talks with NYCFC and Sky Blue rejected the 2013 proposed deal from NYRB.

Oakland, California 
A bid based out of Oakland, California, was announced on November 2, 2022, as part of a strategic alliance between The Town FC and the African American Sports & Entertainment Group. The AASEG is also attempting to bring WNBA and NFL expansions to Oakland, with the goal of these three teams to be based at the current site of the Oakland Arena and Oakland Coliseum.

Philadelphia 
Philadelphia Union President Tim McDermott said that they were having talks with the NWSL League Office regarding possible expansion. They also said that they were doing a assessment of the market for NWSL for the city. Philadelphia is the 4th Largest Market in the United States.

Pittsburgh 
Under new ownership in 2014 after having recently gone through bankruptcy, USL Pro side Pittsburgh Riverhounds also expressed interest in NWSL as an expansion on top of the youth structure already in place. As of 2015, the Riverhounds planned to expand their stadium capacity by 50%, and their target for an NWSL team was 2018.

Other USL markets 
In August 2018, Research Triangle TV station WRAL reported on remarks made by North Carolina Courage owner Steve Malik, also owner of the USL's North Carolina FC, to WRAL's sister radio station. He had been asked about rumors that the NWSL and USL were exploring a partnership, and chose to reframe the question to the issue of league expansion:I just came from the USL meetings. Are there USL clubs that NWSL is talking to? Absolutely. There are some great fits where, if you build a 10,000- to 12,000-seat stadium in an urban area in a top 40 or top 50 market, particularly one that may not have Major League Soccer. If you own that stadium, do you want some dates? Yeah, you want some dates.

The WRAL-TV report speculated that at least five USL markets were potentially viable as NWSL expansion targets for 2020 and beyond. In addition to Louisville, whose NWSL side ultimately debuted in 2021, Hartford, Phoenix, Sacramento, and San Antonio were identified as possible targets. Amanda Duffy, then NWSL director of operations, had connections to the management of San Antonio FC, having previously worked under that club's managing director Tim Holt when he was the president of the USL parent organization. However, after the 2019 FIFA Women's World Cup, USL announced its intention to form its own women's league, which on September 21, 2021, was announced as the second-division USL Super League.  As noted previously, the prospective Sacramento NWSL group changed its focus to San Diego and established San Diego Wave FC in that city for the 2022 NWSL season.

References

Expansion
Proposed sports teams